Dejan Šorak (born 29 March 1954 in Karlovac) is a Croatian film director and screenwriter.

Filmography
Mala pljačka vlaka (1984)
Officer with a Rose (1987)
Najbolji (1989)
Krvopijci (1989)
The Time of Warriors (1991)
Garcia (1999)
Two Players from the Bench (2005)
U zemlji čudesa (2009)

Sources
 Dejan Šorak at hrfilm.hr

External links

1954 births
Croatian film directors
Croatian screenwriters
People from Karlovac
Living people
Golden Arena winners